Wad is an old mining term for any black manganese oxide or hydroxide mineral-rich rock in the oxidized zone of various ore deposits. Typically closely associated with various iron oxides. Specific mineral varieties include pyrolusite, lithiophorite, nsutite, takanelite and vernadite. Wad can be considered to be the manganese equivalent to the iron mineraloid limonite.

References

External links

Manganese minerals
Oxide minerals
Hydroxide minerals
Hydrates